The Geraldine Milwaukee Depot was built by the Chicago, Milwaukee, St. Paul and Pacific Railroad (otherwise known as The Milwaukee Road) in 1914. The depot is a rectangular one-story wood-frame building built in the Craftsman style.

After the completion of The Milwaukee Road's transcontinental extension across the northern tier of states from Chicago, Illinois to Tacoma, Washington on 1909, it began to build branch lines in order to bring in more business and open new markets. In 1913–14, The Milwaukee Road built the North Montana Line from Harlowton, Montana to Great Falls, Montana. New agricultural lands and settlements followed the branch line. Settlers homesteaded around Geraldine, a station named after the wife of railroad financier, William G. Rockefeller.

The depot at Geraldine served the local farms and daily freight and passenger trains stopped there. After World War II, rail traffic declined and passenger served ended in 1955. In 1980 The Milwaukee Road went bankrupt and ceased service to the Pacific Northwest. The North Montana Line was bought by the Burlington Northern Railroad. The rail line was closed due to a landslide in 1982. In 1985, Central Montana Rail bought the line and restored rail service. It sold the depot to the Geraldine Historical Committee in 1995.

The depot was listed in the National Register of Historic Places because of its architecture and its historical significance as one of the last Milwaukee Road depots along the North Montana Line.

Notes

References
Armstrong, Henry, and Marcella Knedler. Geraldine Milwaukee Depot (Chouteau County, Montana), National Register of Historic Places Registration Form, 1997. On file at the National Park Service, Washington, D.C.

Railway stations on the National Register of Historic Places in Montana
Geraldine, Montana
Railway stations in the United States opened in 1914
Railway stations closed in 1955
Transportation in Chouteau County, Montana
National Register of Historic Places in Chouteau County, Montana
Former railway stations in Montana
1914 establishments in Montana